Eatliz is an Israeli alternative/progressive rock band formed by Guy Ben Shetrit of punk rock band Infectzia in 2001. The band is known for its animated music videos and for reinventing itself in every live show. The band members describe their sound as "complicated pop".

History

Formation and early years (2001–2005)
The band was formed in 2001 by guitarist Guy Ben Shetrit of punk rock band Infectzia as a side project. He was joined by singer Yael Kraus and wrote music that was mostly made of complicated guitar tunes and prominent keyboards. This line-up recorded a demo but quickly disbanded, with Ben Shetrit continuing to work under the same band name with some of the members from this line-up - guitarist Or Bahir and drummer Omry Hanegby. New members were added: vocalist Talia Kliger, guitarist Uzi Finerman, bassist Adam Shefflan and keyboardist Yuval Samo. Samo left quickly after joining to study music in the United States, and was replaced with Finerman's partner at the time, Maya Dunitz, who, along with Kliger, took the changing lead vocals position as well as playing keyboards.
Lead vocalist Talia Kliger left the band shortly after joining and keyboardist Maya Dunitz took the lead singer's position and thus the band's first stable line-up was formed.

The band started performing all around Israel, getting a lot of attention in the Israeli indie rock scene due to Dunitz' powerful stage presence and charisma and them hosting many guests from the Israeli alternative and indie scene in their live shows, as well as playing covers of such artists as Soundgarden, Queen, The Beatles, Björk and more. The band recorded a demo in 2003 but it was never released and soon after, guitarist Uzi Finerman left the band due to personal reasons. He was replaced for a short time by Yaron Mitelman, though the band had gone into a hiatus when lead singer Maya Dunitz quit the band as well, to focus on more experimental music projects.

Eatliz returned to the stages in November 2004 with a new singer - Sarit Shazky, Ben Shetrit's life partner at the time. The band's new line-up's shows received mixed reactions and the band still didn't seem to create enough interest from international labels, as they expected, and the band's second demo, was again left unreleased.

Violently Delicate (2005–2008)
In 2005, the band was joined by an additional guitarist - indie/folk artist Amit Erez, after which lead singer Sarit Shazky left the band, and was replaced by Lee Triffon. This line-up of the band proved to be stable and was well received by the audience in the band's shows in 2005, and in August 2006 the band went into Kitcha Studios to record their debut album.

The band's debut album, Violently Delicate, was finally released on November 1, 2007. The material in the album was mostly written in the band's earlier years, between 2003 and 2005, and most of the songs were credited to guitarist Guy Ben Shetrit and former singer Maya Dunitz, with only 2 songs credited to current singer Lee Triffon. The album was released by Anova Music in Israel, Germany, Switzerland and Austria and was very well received. In Israel, it was released on November 8, 2007, in a special release show at the Barby club in Tel Aviv, which draw an audience of around 500 people.

The album's first single "Attractive" became successful around Israel, playing on radio stations. Soon after, the single also received a massive radio airplay in Germany, which led to the invitation of the band to play at the Popkomm Festival in Berlin.

The album was promoted with two worldwide awarded spectacular music videos – "Attractive" and "Hey". "Attractive" was chosen to promote the luxury MTV Artists Spot that was made on the band, and also won the Ourstage.com grand prize, as voted by fans all over the world.
"Hey" participated at over 75 worldwide music video and film festivals, and won 9 international awards, including the Spike Lee Award at Babelgum competition at the Tribeca film festival. Both videos received critical acclaim and gained over 500,000 views on YouTube.

The music video for "Attractive" became very popular on the Israeli music channel Music 24, and the song was also featured on the Israeli heavy metal compilation Israel Unleashed released worldwide by Sony BMG.

In late 2008, bassist Adam Shefflan has left the band to focus on producing and was replaced by Hadar Green.

Delicately Violent (2009–2010)
In 2009, the band's music video for "Attractive" from their debut album was chosen by Israeli channel Channel 24's music video of the year.

In November 2009, the band released their second release and first EP - Delicately Violent, which was compiled of 7 songs, 6 outtakes from the recording sessions of their debut album Violently Delicate, and one newly recorded cover of Björk's "Army of Me" which became a live staple in the band's live shows. The same month, the band had the EP's release party at the Barby club, Tel Aviv, hosting Israeli soul/jazz musician Shlomo Gronich and performing together with him his song "Luna Park", which was also recorded in the studio for Gronich's latest "best-of" compilation.

Teasing Nature (2010–2012)

In late 2009, the band entered the studio to record their second studio album and through 2010 they have worked on recording the album. The album was said to be released in December 2010.

On April and May 2010, the band went on their first German tour, playing a variety of shows in such cities as Hammelburg, Bremen, Hamburg, Berlin and more. This followed an Israeli tour in June 2010, playing such cities as Netanya, Petah Tikva, Jerusalem, Modi'in, Tel Aviv and more. On May 29, 2010, Eatliz played at the Primavera Sound Festival in Barcelona, Spain, playing an additional free Spanish show a day before the show, and in July 2010, the band was the opening act for two international acts on their Israeli shows in Tel Aviv: Porcupine Tree on July 7 and Dweezil Zappa on July 14.

On October 15, 2010, the band performed a one-off special classical orchestral show, in which the band performed their songs in a classical music orchestral arrangements, along with three cellists and a pianist. At this show, the band performed both old songs and songs from the upcoming album.

On October 20, 2010, the band released their first single off the new album, "Berlin", for free download on their official website and Myspace page. The inspiration for the song is the Tel Aviv night life scene and it is a critique point of view of the nocturnal urban experience through a screen of alcohol.

Teasing Nature, the band's second full-length album, was released on December 19, 2010, with a small intimate showcase show that took place at the Levontin 7 club in Tel Aviv on December 5, 2010. A series of special release shows in Tel Aviv, Jerusalem and Haifa took place in January 2011, and a North American tour followed in March & April 2011, with an appearance at the SXSW Festival in Austin, Texas, and opening slots for Consider The Source.

In July 2011, the band performed at the Exit Festival in Novi Sad, Serbia.

In a November 2011 interview, the band announced it plans to release a new album with classical arrangements of its songs in the beginning of 2012, though the album was never actually released.

On July 26, 2012, the band announced the leaving of lead singer, Lee Triffon, and guitarist, Amit Erez. According to the band, Lee Triffon decided to leave a few months earlier, due to "artistic differences". Unlike her, Amit Erez decided to focus on his solo career. According to the official announcement, the band decided "to continue and find a new magnificent singer" and that they are "ready for the next chapter of their journey together". Replacing Lee Triffon as the lead singer is Sivan Abelson, a graduate singer from Rimon, school of jazz and contemporary music. Also, replacing Amit Erez is the guitarist Omer Hershman from the band Panic Ensemble.

All of it (2013–present)

In December 2013, the band released a first single featuring their new vocalist Sivan Abelson, "Miserable". In January 2014 the band released a second single featuring Abelson, "One of Us".
In June 2014, the band released a new album, All of it, with a showcase that took place in the "Tmuna" club in Tel Aviv, and with a small Israeli tour which took place in various locations around Israel, including the "Syrup" club in Haifa and the "Yellow Submarine" club in Jerusalem. With the release of the album, the band's bassist Hadar Green had left the band for unknown reasons and was replaced by Noam Shaham.

Musical style and influences
The band's musical style is mostly labeled as alternative rock and progressive rock, but it takes influences and elements from punk rock, hard rock, folk rock, heavy metal, pop, surf rock, gothic rock, britpop, power pop, Arabic music, jazz, bossa nova and more. The band members themselves describe their sound as "complicated pop".

The band states such bands as Mr. Bungle, The Mars Volta, Sleepytime Gorilla Museum, Cardiacs, Portishead and Björk, as their main influences.

Band members
Current members
Sivan Abelson - lead vocals (2012–present)
Omer Hershman - guitar, vocals (2012–present)
Guy Ben Shetrit - guitar (2001–present)
Noam Shaham - bass (2014–present)
Omry Hanegby - drums, percussion (2001–present)

Former members
Hadar Green - bass (2008–2014)
Or Bahir - guitar (2001–2012)
Lee Triffon - lead vocals (2006–2012)
Amit Erez - guitar, vocals (2004–2012)
Adam Shefflan - bass, vocals (2003–2008)
Maya Dunitz - lead vocals, keyboards (2003–2004)
Sarit Shazky - lead vocals, keyboards (2004–2005)
Uzi Finerman - guitar (2003)
Yaron Mitelman - guitar (2003–2004)
Yuval Samo - keyboards (2003)
Talia Kliger - lead vocals (2003)

Discography
Violently Delicate (2007)
Delicately Violent (2009)
Teasing Nature (2010)
All of it (2014)

References

External links
There’s no borders in music: Eatliz X Calvin Wong (Interview) on Bitetone.com

Israeli alternative rock groups
Israeli progressive rock groups
Musical groups established in 2001